Anita Kanwal is an Indian television actress and producer who has acted in television serials such as Chanakya, Shanti and Sonpari. She is best known for her negative role of Mrs. Seth, the mother who gets her own son killed, in the 1990s Zee TV soap opera Banegi Apni Baat.

Kanwal started her own production house in 2002 and produced the television serial Goonj Ateet Ki. She made her film debut in 1993 with Kabhi Haan Kabhi Naa (1993).
Television Actress Pooja Kanwal is her daughter.

Filmography

Films

Television

Awards

References

Further reading
Shifting focus August 2003 Screen Magazine article.

Indian television actresses
Indian film actresses
Living people
Indian soap opera actresses
1954 births